Neaeromya rugifera is a species of bivalve that inhabits the West Coast of North America.

Description 
Neaeromya rugifera is a species of symbiotic bivalve that can be found on the abdomen of Upogebia pugettensis and on the ventral surface of Aphrodita, a genus of polychaete worm. They can attach and detach themselves at will using their byssus. The largest examples of the species were found to be 6mm in length, 2.5mm in height, and 1.5mm in width. N. rugifera do possess teeth, but no chondrophore. One investigation of stomach contents found remains of diatoms and protozoans. Sexual dimorphism is seen as female N. rugifera being larger than their male counterparts. Males can be found to reside in the mantle cavity of females. A 2008 study found no evidence of N. rugifera causing weight loss in U. pugettensis.

Distribution 
Neaeromya rugifera is spread across the West Coast, from Kodiak, Alaska, to Punta Rompiente, Baja California.

References 

Lasaeidae
Molluscs of the Pacific Ocean
Molluscs described in 1864
Taxa named by Philip Pearsall Carpenter